Mohamed Ali Doumbouya (born 18 July 1978) is a Guinean former footballer who played as a striker.

Career
Born in Conakry, Doumbouya played for US Saint-Georges, Montauban FCTG, Limoges FC, Bourg-Péronnas, Stade Brestois, GSI Pontivy, Entente SSG, Libourne-Saint-Seurin, Pacy Vallée-d'Eure, FC Rouen, Racing Besançon, US Orléans, USM Saran, Étoile FC, Bergerac Périgord, Montceau and Gueugnon.

Doumbouya made one international appearance for Guinea in 2008, scoring two goals on his debut.

References

1978 births
Living people
Guinean footballers
Guinea international footballers
US Saint-Georges players
Montauban FCTG players
Limoges FC players
Football Bourg-en-Bresse Péronnas 01 players
Stade Brestois 29 players
GSI Pontivy players
Entente SSG players
FC Libourne players
Pacy Ménilles RC players
FC Rouen players
Racing Besançon players
US Orléans players
USM Saran players
Étoile FC players
Bergerac Périgord FC players
FC Montceau Bourgogne players
FC Gueugnon players
Singapore Premier League players
Association football forwards
Guinean expatriate footballers
Guinean expatriates in France
Expatriate footballers in France
Guinean expatriates in Singapore
Expatriate footballers in Singapore